The Japan women's national squash team represents Japan in international squash team competitions, and is governed by the Japan Squash Association.

Current team
 Misaki Kobayashi
 Satomi Watanabe
 Risa Sugimoto
 Mami Sakai

Results

World Team Squash Championships

See also 
 Japan Squash Association
 World Team Squash Championships
 Japan men's national squash team

References

External links 
 Team Japan

Squash teams
Women's national squash teams
Squash in Japan
Women's national sports teams of Japan